The 2019–20 Stetson Hatters men's basketball team represents Stetson University in the 2019–20 NCAA Division I men's basketball season. The Hatters, led by first-year head coach Donnie Jones, play their home games at the Edmunds Center in DeLand, Florida as members of the Atlantic Sun Conference.

Previous season
The Hatters finished the 2018–19 season 7–24 overall, 3–13 in ASUN play to finish in a tie for 8th place, but after tiebreakers, they missed the ASUN tournament.

Following the conclusion of the season, Stetson fired head coach Corey Williams, who finished his time at Stetson with a six-season record of 58 wins and 133 losses. On March 29, 2019, Donnie Jones was named as Williams' successor.

Roster

Schedule and results

|-
!colspan=12 style=| Exhibition

|-
!colspan=12 style=| Non-conference regular season

|-
!colspan=9 style=| Atlantic Sun Conference regular season

|-
!colspan=12 style=| Atlantic Sun tournament
|-

|-

Source

References

Stetson Hatters men's basketball seasons
Stetson Hatters
Stetson Hatters men's basketball
Stetson Hatters men's basketball